Twin is a Norwegian television crime drama series that premiered on 27 October 2019 on the government-owned, public broadcaster NRK. The series was created, written and directed by Kristoffer Metcalfe and stars Kristofer Hivju as Erik and Adam. The series debuted at the Series Mania festival in Lille in March 2019.

Synopsis
Erik and Adam are identical twins, living completely different lives. Erik is a broke surfer bum, Adam a successful family and businessman. When Erik seeks out his brother for the first time in 15 years, a quarrel ends with Adam’s wife, Ingrid, believing she's accidentally killed Adam. Erik loses Adam from a boat on the way to the emergency room at the local hospital, and Adam actually dies from drowning (as revealed later by an autopsy). To avoid being arrested for accidental murder and to save his brother’s family, Erik takes over Adam’s identity, strongly encouraged by Ingrid, who is monitoring the events, without much thought of her and Adam's two children. Erik's biggest challenge is not avoiding getting caught, but pretending to be someone he is not.

Cast
 Kristofer Hivju as Adam & Erik
 Rebekka Nystabakk as Ingrid Williksen
 Mathilde Holtedahl Cuhra as Karin Williksen
 Gunnar Eiriksson as Frank
 Nanna Blondell as Mary
 Vebjørn Enger as Young Erik
 Sigrid Erdal as Young Ingrid
 Ellen Birgitte Winther as Margrete
 Kingsford Siayor as Sander
 Øyvind Samuel Palerud as Fredrik Wiliksen
 John Sigurd Kristensen as Alfred Wiliksen
 Sigurd Kornelius Lakseide as Glenn
 Sara Daldorff Kanck as Vilde
 Marlon Langeland as Lukas
 Ingri Arthur as Sara
 Kim Sørensen as Thomas
 Trude-Sofie Anthonsen as Johanne
 Torstein Bjørklund as Henrik
 Fanny Bjørn as Mille
 Milla Fischer-Yndestad as Tone
 Aslag Guttormsgaard as Jakob
 Rebekka Robinson Gynge as Grete
 Trond Halbo as Undertaker
 Svein Harry Hauge as Hugo
 Ingrid Jerstad as Josefine
 John Emil Jørgensrud as Trond
 Tom Krane as Jesper 2
 Jan Olav Larssen as Boat Neighbor
 Hæge Manheim as Viktor’s wife
 Lena Meieran as Randi
 Torunn Meyer as Employee #1
 Franklin Mukadi as Jesper
 Camilla Steine Munk as Mother
 Øyvind Rørtveit as Roger
 Ragna Schwenke as Edel
 Maja Skogstad as Janet
 Kaveh Tehrani as Doctor
 Jason Turner as Journalist
 Bjørn Isak Winther as Little boy

References

External links

2019 Norwegian television series debuts
2010s Norwegian television series
Norwegian crime television series
Norwegian drama television series
Television shows set in Norway
Twins in fiction